Loehle Aircraft Corporation (pronounced "Low-lee") was an aircraft manufacturer located in Wartrace, Tennessee, that produced aircraft kits and a complete line of paints for all types of aircraft, including metal, composite and fabric covered. It manufactured aircraft kits for 40 years, with aircraft being built and flown in 26 countries.

History
This company manufactured aircraft kits from 1977 to 2017. In 1981 Mike Lohle won the Experimental Aircraft Association Oshkosh  Ultralight Grand Champion Award and also the award for Outstanding Craftsmanship for his Easy Riser ultralight. 

Sandra Loehle, VP of Operations and wife of founder Michael Loehle, died of cancer in 2017. The company seems to have ceased operations at that time.

Aircraft

References

External links
 Last archived copy of official Web site - 1 July 2017
Loehle Aircraft Corporation on City of Tullahoma, State of Tennessee website, archived 30 June 2013 

Defunct aircraft manufacturers of the United States